African countries have the following coats of arms or national emblems:

Sovereign states

States with limited recognition

Dependencies, autonomous regions, autonomous cities and other territories

See also
 Flags of Africa
 Armorial of sovereign states
 Armorial of North America
 Armorial of South America
 Armorial of Asia
 Armorial of Europe
 Armorial of Oceania

Africa-related lists
Africa
 
Africa